The Beefeater is a fictional character, a comic book superhero published by DC Comics. He appeared in his civilian identity as Michael Morice in Justice League International Annual #3 (1989), and debuted as Beefeater in Justice League Europe #20 (November 1990) in a story by Keith Giffen, Gerard Jones and Marshall Rogers. His code name and appearance are both taken from the uniform of the Yeomen Warders.

Fictional character biography
The Beefeater was introduced in the pages of Justice League Europe #20, typical of the farcical treatment given to the superhero genre in the 1980s and 1990s Justice League comics, the Beefeater is similar to the rude and pompous Basil Fawlty, a character in the British television sitcom Fawlty Towers. He is Britain's hero using a power-rod used by his father (The Beefeater of the Second World War), to try to protect Britain, but instead causes havoc as he goes.

Michael Morice is a staff member at the Justice League London embassy. Supporting him is his wife and Esteban, the latter of whom has a poor grasp of English (both resembling characters from Fawlty Towers). Michael finds the original Beefeater's costume and power-rod in the attic. After accidentally blowing a hole in the attic floor, he is confronted by his wife, who dislikes the entire deal. Michael argues that the Beefeater has a long heroic tradition, such as fighting alongside General Glory in World War II. His wife, like most people, believe General Glory's adventures to be fictional comic book events, which is exactly what Glory's superior officers had wanted. Furthermore, she believes that the original Beefeater flubbed his first mission and spent the war in a Bulgarian prison, only later to use the 'stick' for tricks down at the pub. It is not made clear which version is correct, especially with the subterfuge surrounding Glory. Michael, ever determined, leaves the embassy while his wife is trying to have Esteban contact Maxwell Lord, the current League boss. After donning the costume he decides to join Justice League Europe, however the JLE Embassy's security system saw him as a threat and attacks him. The JLE, Kilowog and Beefeater try to defend themselves from the security system, leading to the destruction of the embassy itself.

Morice later appears as caretaker of the JLE's London embassy, closed down at the time. When the embassy is attacked by Despero, Beefeater and the JLI Interpol liaison, Inspector Camus, bravely battle the alien conqueror, but are savagely beaten. They survive, though, and stick together for some time.

52

Beefeater appears in 52, week 18 (Day 4), carrying Booster Gold's coffin after attending a memorial in a Cincinnati church. Due to Gold's previous superhero mistakes, including staging fights for personal glory, he was very unpopular and this was all Skeets could arrange. Beefeater's fellow pall-bearers are Mind-Grabber Kid, Yellow Peri, Honest Abe, the Odd Man, and the Blimp. Founding Justice League member Superman, in his identity as Clark Kent, also attends. The Beefeater is briefly seen as one of the dozens of super-beings kidnapped by the forces of the Auctioneer. All entities are later freed unharmed. His old ally, Blue Jay, is essential in this rescue.

Batman and Robin

The Beefeater returns in the pages of Batman and Robin #7 as the Queen's Jailer, warden of Basement 101 Britain's main para-criminal detention facility.

References

External links
DC Database: Michael Morice
DC Database: Justice League Europe #20

DC Comics superheroes
Comics characters introduced in 1990
United Kingdom-themed superheroes